Veronica filiformis is a species of flowering plant in the family Plantaginaceae. It is known by many common names, including slender speedwell, creeping speedwell, threadstalk speedwell and Whetzel weed. It is native to eastern Europe and western Asia, and it is known in many other regions as an introduced species.

Description
V. filiformis is a rhizomatous perennial herb producing mats of hairy stems that readily root at nodes that touch substrate. It is self-sterile and rarely seeds, being spread by stolons. The corolla of V. filiformis is four-lobed and blueish with a white tip, around 8–10 mm in diameter, the top lobe being largest since it is actually a fusion of two lobes. At the center are two long, protruding stamens. Solitary flowers occur in leaf axils. They are on relatively long, slender stalks that arise from the leaf axils, and appear between April and July. The leaves, found near the base of the stem, are 5–10 mm across, rounded or kidney-shaped with blunt teeth and short stalks, and smaller on distal parts. It is perennial. In Ireland, the plant was sewn into the clothing of travellers for good luck.

Status and habitat
A native to northern Turkey and the Caucasus, V. filiformis was introduced to the United Kingdom from Turkey in 1808 as a rock garden plant and was first reported as an escape in 1838. It was introduced to the United States nursery trade in the 1920s. It can sometimes be considered a nuisance in lawns, sod, and turf. It is found in gardens, grassy paths and in meadows, where it prefers shade, moist soils, good fertility and a low mowing height.

It reproduces asexually by resprouting from separated sections of stem and rhizome and easily takes hold in new habitat. The plant is used as groundcover in gardens, and valued for its pretty blue flowers, but it is easily dispersed into the environment if it is chopped up, during mowing, for example. It is still cultivated, sold, and used in gardening.

Identification
V. filiformis is similar to other Veronica species, such as V. arvensis and V. chamaedrys, but can be distinguished by the size of its leaves and lack of seed capsules.

Common names
V. filiformis is known by the following common names:
Slender speedwell
Creeping speedwell
Threadstalk speedwell
Caucasian speedwell
Round-leaved speedwell
Creeping Veronica
Whetzel weed

References

External links
Jepson Manual Treatment
Washington Burke Museum
Photo gallery

filiformis
Flora of Turkey
Flora of the United Kingdom